Human Resource (HR) metrics are measurements used to determine the value and effectiveness of HR initiatives, typically including such areas as turnover, training, return on human capital, costs of labor, and expenses per employee.

Efficiency of HR functions
It is often required of human resource departments to show the organizational value of money and time spent on human resources management training and activities. The value of reporting and analysis of HR performance in various areas aims to improve the organizations function and internal temperature. HR's challenge is to provide business leaders with actionable information that helps them make decisions about investments, marketing strategies and new products. HR metrics are a vital way to quantify the cost and the impact of employee programs and HR processes and measure the success (or failure) of HR initiatives. They enable a company to track year-to year-trends and changes in these critical variables. It is how organizations measure the value of the time and money spent on HR activities in their organization.

The following are some of the examples on efficiency of the HR functions:

Cost per hire: It is the cost associated with a new hire. It is not only important to know how much it cost in hiring, but it is also important to see if the money spent is used to hire right people. (Boudreau; Lawler & Levenson, 2004)
 Time to fill: It is the total days to fill up a job opening per each job. The shorter the time, the more efficient of the HR department in finding the replacement for the job
 HR expense factor: It is the ratio between total company expense and HR expense. It shows if the expenses on HR practices are too much in terms of the whole company expense.

Effectiveness of HR functions
It shows whether the HR practices have a positive effect on the employees or the applicant pool. This is very important for HR because they are regarded as the leader for acquiring, developing and helping to deploy talent. (Boudreau; Lawler & Levenson, 2004)

The following are some of the examples on effectiveness of the HR functions: (Kavanagh & Thite, 2009)

 Training ROI: It is the total financial gain an organization have from a particular training. It shows the effectiveness of the training program and how much it can benefit to the company after the training.
 Absent rate: It determines the company is having an absent problem from the employees. It also reflects the effectiveness of the HR policies as well as the company's own policies. It always goes along with employee satisfaction.

Developing core competency
Metrics help develop core competency by demonstrating the connection between HR practices and the tangible effects on an organization's ability to gain and sustain competitive advantage. This approach often treats employees as human capital instead of  expense. (Boudreau; Lawler & Levenson, 2004)

The following are some of the examples on effectiveness of the HR functions:

1. Revenue factor: It indicates the effectiveness of company operation with the use of the employees as their human capital.
 
2. Defects rate: It indicates the number of defective products in the operation. The lower the defect rate, the more effective the HR practices in developing companies' core competency in terms of reducing cost.

HR metric & Human Capital

Human Capital is another big topic in nowadays HR practices. HR no longer only assess their effectiveness and efficiency and the contribution to the company, but also they are starting to measure how those practices can positively affect the human capital (employees) in the organization. “Based on corporate culture, organizational values and strategic business goals and objectives, human capital measures indicate the health of the organization.” (Lockwood, 2006)

There is a special tool for HR to measure the human capital and it is called Key Performance Indicators (KPIs). It helps measure human capital outcomes, such as talent management, employee engagement and high performance, illustrates the firm's business, financial and strategic goals, and promotes partnership with senior management for organizational success. Nowadays, HR people integrated the traditional metrics to KPI which aligned with corporate objectives. The best KPIs should be able to reflect the human capital performance, such as financial outcomes, performance drivers. At the same time, when determining strategic KPIs, it is essential to consider who designs human capital measures and how they are created. The best way to design a good KPI is to communicate with the company business managers who know the jobs the best in their own divisions.

Nancy Lockwood suggests the following 5 assists that can help HR to create a better KPI. It includes involving HR in  overall business strategy;  Enlisting leaders outside of HR to help develop the KPIs; Collaborating with business managers to ensure KPIs link to business unit strategic goals; Focusing more attention on links between people measures and intermediate performance drivers (e.g., customer satisfaction, engagement etc.); Increasing manager acceptance through training programs and concrete action plans; Working with HR to simplify metric and automate data collection.

Human Resources & Metrics

Human capital is important to organization because they are the people who are actually working for the organization. They build the company's core competencies and competitive advantages to the organization. With effective management of the human capital, a company can achieve the maximum outputs from its own human capital and be superior to other competitors.

Some organizations are unaware even of how many people they have in their organization. The problem with HR is that they have been held unaccountable in the initiatives and programs they promote across the organization. Typically, nobody in the organization, let alone top business leaders of the organization are aware of the impact of these programs whether, positive or negative. This is because HR leaders have not been delivering metrics that show the value of their programs or investments. HR metrics is important because it allows organizations to make the connection between the value of what HR is doing and the outcomes of the business. If HR professionals don't measure their function's effectiveness and providing decision-making leaders the data they need, HR will continue to be undermined and eventually sidelined when it comes to having a seat at the table. Therefore, many experts urge HR professionals to use the data they have in front of them and understanding how metrics and analysis could give HR an advantage as an overall better strategic partner. This will allow them to help business leaders solve the people problems that matter to the organization.

Before HR metrics, many of the HR activities and processes were difficult to quantify, making it hard to fully understand the real employee costs associated with each HR functions. For example, “a decade ago, if someone looked for turnover rate by performance category, it could be a two-week project.” With HR metrics, more specifically Retention metrics, HR leaders are able to quantify variables such as turnover rate, average tenure, the rate of veteran worker, or the financial impact of employee turnover. These results can indicate how much separating employees is costing the company and help the company to create proactive plans to prevent future loss of top talent.

More importantly, metrics enable leaders and decision makers in organizations towards more efficient and better delivery of HR services

HR Metrics and Data

Executives tend to make consistently better decisions when they use facts gathered from their organizations in objective ways. Many of the important decisions made by executives affect the business and the bottom line; therefore, in order to convince executive leaders that organizations are benefiting from their people or on the contrary, losing money and wasting resources, HR will need to provide palpable evidence. This evidence can be found in HR Metrics. The key to finding the right metrics for your organization needs is to identify the overall business needs as organizations may differ in terms of the metrics they use. Metrics used by the organization need to show data on how human capital strategy is effective and that organizations are acquiring, developing and deploying the proper talent. Organizations that have trouble deciding what metrics to use for their organizations can always enlist the help of a specialist or consultant to do a company-wide assessment on their organization.

Measuring Key Data with HR Metrics

As long as you have employees, you will have turnover, both voluntary and involuntary and any turnover experienced by the organization is money and resources being lost. Most companies have no idea the impact turnover has on the organization but when the cost of turnover is 15%, 25% or 35% of an organization's profits, it has a big impact on organizations as a whole. By having your organization use metrics, organizations will be surprised by how much their HR functions can save on hiring, staffing, and separation costs.

Below are some suggestions for organizations interested in tracking talent through metrics should consider the following:

Percentage of performance goals met or exceeded, showing if the organization is meeting the performance goal aligned with its mission
Percentage of employees' rate at the top performance appraisal level who are paid above average salary
Percentage of top performing employees who resign for compensation related reasons
Turnover percentages of low-performing managers
Percentage of employees in performance management programs that show improvement within a year
Percentage and rate of involuntary turnover in key positions

Having HR metrics is first part and a critical one and obtaining the data is another but being able make meaning and provide a compelling story as to what the data means in relation to the business strategy is just as crucial.

Software’s and Outsourcing HR Metrics

For the most part, HR professionals in many companies probably don't need to purchase additional software to create valid metrics. The trick is knowing where to look and how to extract data. If using the correct HR information systems, most information systems should include reporting tools that can provide data on learning and performance management or financial systems. However, organizations have to ensure that the data they have uphold integrity and are quality data.

While HR systems is one way of obtaining metrics, many organizations because of lack of resources or time, or simply because they don't know where to begin can enlist the help of a retention specialist or purchase metric systems designed solely for HR Metrics.

The HRIS systems (Workday, Successfactors, Oracle HR, etc.) provide often strong reporting tools within the systems to reflect cost of people. While talent acquisition systems (like Taleo, etc.) Provide insight in recruitment costs. If the HR department wants to create data around organizational insight, engagement, culture and in general the opinions of the employees, software like FieldRate (business intelligence) or Beekeeper (more focused on communications) can be used, especially if there is a need to reach the employees who do not have a corporate email addresses.

References

Shrm hrmetrics analytics (Membership Required)
Shrm publications (Membership Required)Case study of Hrmetrics

Human resource management
Metrics